The name test is a top-level domain (TLD) that is intended for use in the testing of software. The name was reserved by the Internet Engineering Task Force (IETF) in RFC 2606 (June 1999) and is not intended to ever be installed into the global Domain Name System (DNS) of the Internet. Because neither test nor any of its subdomains can be registered, they can be used for testing purposes without fear of conflicts with current or future domain names. Another 11 test domains are: .测试, .परीक्षा, .испытание, .테스트, .טעסט, .測試, .آزمایشی, .பரிட்சை, .δοκιμή, .إختبار, .テスト.

Reserved DNS names

The reason for reservation of these top-level domain names is to reduce the likelihood of conflict and confusion. This allows the use of these names for either documentation purposes or in local testing scenarios. "IANA.org states Domains which are described as registered to IANA or ICANN on policy grounds are not available for registration or transfer, with the exception of country-name.info domains. These domains are available for release by the ICANN Governmental Advisory Committee Secretariat."

References

Top-level domains
Computer-related introductions in 1999

sv:Toppdomän#Generiska toppdomäner